The Death of Empedocles is a 1987 West German drama film directed by Danièle Huillet and Jean-Marie Straub. It was entered into the 37th Berlin International Film Festival.

Cast
 Martina Baratta
 Vladimir Baratta
 William Berger
 Georg Brintrup
 Howard Vernon
 Andreas von Rauch

References

External links

1987 films
1980s avant-garde and experimental films
German avant-garde and experimental films
French avant-garde and experimental films
West German films
1980s German-language films
Films directed by Jean-Marie Straub and Danièle Huillet
German films based on plays
Friedrich Hölderlin
Biographical films about philosophers
1980s German films
1980s French films